Cryptandra armata is a flowering plant in the family Rhamnaceae and is endemic to Queensland. It is a shrub with spiny branchlets, spatula-shaped to lance-shaped or egg-shaped leaves with the narrower end towards the base, and creamy-white tube-shaped to bell-shaped flowers.

Description
The flowers are usually borne singly on short pedicels with brown bracts at the base.

Taxonomy and naming
Cryptandra armata was first formally described in 1922 by Cyril Tenison White and William Douglas Francis  in the Proceedings of the Royal Society of Queensland from specimens collected at Barakula. The specific epithet (armata ) means "armed".

Distribution and habitat
This cryptandra grows in sandy soil over sandstone or granite from Ashford in New South Wales to Gladstone and as far inland as Morven in Queensland.

References

armata
Rosales of Australia
Flora of Queensland
Flora of New South Wales
Plants described in 1922
Taxa named by Cyril Tenison White
Taxa named by William Douglas Francis